is a Japanese animator and character designer.

Career
Shiotsuki joined Hadashi Pro in the early 2000s as a rookie in-between animator. Within a few years, he left the studio and joined Shaft around 2003. Initially, Shiotsuki continued with in-between work, but was promoted to key animator within a year; and by 2006, he was doing animation direction work. In 2008, Shiotsuki received his first job as a character designer for one of the Shina Dark music videos. Soon thereafter, he became more involved with Shaft's works as a main staff member taking on a variety of different roles from accessory designer, to chief animation director, and so forth. His first character design work for a televised anime, however, came in 2015 when he designed the characters for Gourmet Girl Graffiti. In 2022, he designed the characters for the Strike Witches spin-off series Luminous Witches.

Works
This is an incomplete list.

Teleivison series
 Highlights character design or chief animation direction roles. Highlights other main animation staff member roles.

OVAs

References

External links

Japanese animators
Living people
Japanese people